Flight for Life is a prehospital care service in the United States.

Flight for Life may also refer to:

 Flight for Life (Valley Hospital)
 Fight for Life (film), 1987 American drama film
 Fight for Life (TV series), 2007 British television series
 Fight for Life (video game), 1996 fighting video game